Phaea kellyae is a species of beetle in the family Cerambycidae. It was described by Chemsak in 1999. It is known from Costa Rica, Mexico and Guatemala.

References

kellyae
Beetles described in 1999